Giovanni Francesco Zarbula was a mural painter and sundial designer from Piedmont Italy who created a hundred or more vertical and vertical declining sundials in the French and Italian Alpes between 1830 and 1881. He worked exclusively in Savoy, in Piémont, the Valley of the Ubaye, le Queyras and around Briançon.

Laying out the dial

Zarbula's method was one of observation then geometric construction. He did not need to know the latitude or declination of the wall, he did not use tables or calculations he just worked directly on the wall. All his dial were within 2° of the 45th parallel, simplifying the  construction, and all gave five-minute accuracy.

With a plumb bob he drew a vertical line on the wall. This is the "Noon Line".
He hammered a rod into the wall at right angles to the vertical. This is known as the "centre of the dial", or C
He observed and marked the shadow thrown by the tip of that rod, throughout a day. This line, technically known as a hyperbolic declination line.
Using a set of compasses, he determines the line of symmetry on the wall. This is the "substyle line".

All the rest of the dial was laid out using a 45° square, with a 15° measure at the end.   
 He drew a horizontal line at a point of choice on the dial plate. This was the "Horizon".
 The square was placed on the substyle facing outwards, it is slid into any convenient position where it cuts the horizon, and he drew a perpendicular line drawn to that point. This line is called the "equatorial". A line was drawn from that point to the centre of the dial; it was the 18h line (or 6h depending on the declination (d) of the wall). The points where the equatorial crosses the noon line and where the equatorial crosses the substyle line were important.
 He placed apex of the square on the substyle line, so the sides passed through the equatorial points mentioned. (The 12h and 18h markers). The apex point is called the "auxiliary equatorial centre".
 A protractor or squares  drew off 15° intervals on the equatorial. These were connected to the centre of the dial: the hour lines.  The distance from the auxiliary equatorial centre to the equatorial formed the substyle height at that point.

The colours
Zarbula treated his paintings as frescos so the body colour was embedded in the supporting lime mortar. He didn't use organic pigments, just oxides. These do not fade in the strong alpine sunlight.

Existing Dials (cadrans) 

Of the hundred dials by Zarbula, about 50 have survived, and a further dozen show visible traces.
In Hautes-Alpes, seven dials are protected as monument historique.

His dials can be divided into three specific styles Öiseau (Birds), Geometric, Baroque. The birds that appear in the dials of the early 1840s include toucans, jabirus, parakeets and other exotic birds not seen in these mountains. The geometric works of the late 1840s and 1850s are noted or their simplicity, and contain a little trompe-l'œil to give the design some artificial depth. The baroque dials are contain birds, vases, full trompe-l'œil and false-marbling. They contain the symbols of the Second Empire (1852-1870) and Napoleon III particularly the Imperial Eagle. The dials produced after 1865 include the Masonic device of the Square and Compasses: this is co-incidental to the rise and acceptance of masonry on both sides of the Italian French border.

References 
Footnotes

References

External links
Zarbula's Sundials 

Sundials